Grzegorz Targoński (born 19 August 1978) is a Polish archer. He competed in the men's individual event at the 2000 Summer Olympics.

References

1978 births
Living people
Polish male archers
Olympic archers of Poland
Archers at the 2000 Summer Olympics
Sportspeople from Warsaw